Walmart Inc. is an American multinational retail corporation.

Wal-Mart or Walmart may also refer to:
Wal-Mart (fossil) or Camelops, a prehistoric camel bone found at the construction site of a Wal-Mart store in Mesa, Arizona
Walmart (golf tournament), a golf tournament on the Champions Tour for which Walmart was the title sponsor from 2004 to 2009
Walmart (neologism) or Walmarting
"Walmart" (song), a song by Rodney Carrington

See also
Wal-Mart bill, nickname for the Fair Share Health Care Act
Walmart Canada, the Canadian unit of Walmart
Walmart Neighborhood Market, a grocery store chain
Walmartopia